The Swaziland national rugby sevens team is a minor national sevens side. It has competed at the Commonwealth Sevens

See also
 Swaziland national rugby union team 
 Rugby union in Swaziland

Rugby union in Eswatini
National rugby sevens teams
National sports teams of Eswatini